Walter Auffenberg ( – ) was an American biologist who spent almost 40 years in field research, studying reptile and amphibian paleontology and the systematics and biology of numerous reptile species, including alligators and Komodo dragons.

Early life
Auffenberg was born in Detroit, Michigan in 1928.  After graduating high school, he relocated to DeLand, Florida to work on two small citrus groves owned by his parents.  Shortly after, he enlisted in the US Navy and trained as a Hospital Corpsman in Corpus Christi, Texas.  Upon his discharge he returned to Florida and attended Stetson University in DeLand, receiving his Bachelor of Science in zoology in 1951.  He moved to Gainesville, Florida to obtain his advanced degrees at the University of Florida.

Academic life
Auffenberg received his M.Sc. from the University of Florida in 1953 with his thesis A Study of Geographic Morphological Variation in the Blacksnake.  He held a temporary position as Curator of Vertebrate Paleontology at The Charleston Museum in 1954 and a Special Student in Paleontology at Harvard University in 1955–56; obtaining his doctoral degree at the University of Florida in 1956. He wrote his dissertation on the fossil snakes of Florida.

In 1959 he and his family moved to Boulder, Colorado to assist his former adviser, Arnold Grobman to start up the innovative and popular high school science program Biological Sciences Curriculum Study (BSCS).  Missing time in the field, Auffenberg returned to Gainesville, Florida, the University of Florida in 1963 to assume the role of Chairman of the Natural Sciences Department and Curator of Herpetology at the Florida Museum of Natural History (then the Florida State Museum).  He remained as chairman until 1971 when he stepped down to concentrate on research.

Auffenberg retired as Curator of Herpetology in 1991 and was named Emeritus Distinguished Service Professor/Curator.

In 1969, Auffenberg and his family moved to Komodo Island for 11 months where Auffenberg could study the Komodo dragon in its natural habitat. During their stay, Auffenberg, his family and his assistant Putra Sastrawan captured and tagged more than 50 Komodo dragons. The research from the Auffenberg expedition would prove to be influential in the future propagation of Komodo dragons in captivity.

Auffenberg authored over 130 books and papers during his lifetime, including his work on the herpetology of Pakistan, which produced one of the world's largest collections of reptiles and amphibians from Pakistan. He is most famous for The Behavioral Ecology of the Komodo Monitor in 1981, for which he received the  Best Wildlife Book Award from The Wildlife Society.  Several living and fossil species, including the peacock monitor (Varanus auffenbergi) were named for him. Advances in Monitor Research II, the proceedings of a symposium on monitor lizards held in 1997, is dedicated to Auffenberg "in recognition of his outstanding contributions to monitor lizard biology".

Books

References

External links 
 

1928 births
2004 deaths
American herpetologists
American paleontologists
20th-century American zoologists
Scientists from Detroit